
Gmina Żelechów is an urban-rural gmina (administrative district) in Garwolin County, Masovian Voivodeship, in east-central Poland.

Villages
Apart from the town of Żelechów, Gmina Żelechów contains the villages and settlements of Antonówka, Bród, Budki, Budki Kotłowskie, Gąsiory, Goniwilk-Las, Gózdek, Huta Żelechowska, Janówek, Jezioro, Józefów, Kalinów, Kałuskie, Kontrowers, Kotłówka, Łomnica, Łużki, Michalin (Gąsiory), Michalin (Janówek), Nad Rzeką, Nowy Goniwilk, Nowy Kębłów, Ostrożeń Trzeci, Piastów, Pod Lasem, Podlasie, Podwierzbie, Sokolniki, Stary Goniwilk, Stary Kębłów, Stefanów, Władysławów, Wola Żelechowska and Zakrzówek.

Neighbouring gminas
Gmina Żelechów is bordered by the gminas of Górzno, Kłoczew, Miastków Kościelny, Sobolew, Trojanów and Wola Mysłowska.

References
Polish official population figures 2006

Zelechow
Garwolin County